Alaric Tay (born Tay Liang Hoong; born 26 June 1979), is a Singaporean director, producer and actor.

Early life 
Tay was born in Singapore and raised in a strict Christian family. Tay would later passionately pursue entertainment as the career of his choice and graduated with a degree in film studies from Griffith University in Australia.

He began his career in the film and television scene as an actor at the age of seventeen. He was given a supporting role in a made-in-Singapore feature film called That's the Way I Like It, which was personally picked up for distribution in 1998 by Harvey Weinstein.

Acting career 
Tay has taken on diverse roles over the years, including leads in tele-movies like Ang Tao Mui, Adventures of Holden Heng, and a well-received comic turn in the dramedy, Money. Alaric also played lead roles in the sitcom, The Yang Sisters Season 1 & 2 which ran on Mediacorp's Channel 5 as well as Random Acts, which was aired on Arts Central. His amusing physicality has provided shows like Whizzes of the Void Deck. He also played the role of a Chinese prisoner in a Lion TV production of The Great Wall of China and the role of Daniel in the film Carrot Cake Conversations.

He is also known for his role as nasal-voiced field reporter Andre Chichak in the MediaCorp Channel 5 satirical sitcom The Noose. He appeared as Kang in the 2013 HBO Asia presentation of Serangoon Road and as James in the Singapore Police Force-commissioned series C.L.I.F. 3 in 2014.

Film-making career 
With various performance credits to his name, Tay is also an award-winning filmmaker. His film When We Were Bengs snagged 3 prizes at the 2007 ReelHeART International Film Festival, for Best Experimental Film, Best Sound and Best Editing, while his short documentary Journey of Change has garnered critical acclaim from audiences at its special screenings in Singapore, Malaysia, Australia, and the U.S.

In 2011, Tay started developing his first sci-fi action film, Final Defect. The 12-minute short film, a sci-fi tale about the dangers of playing God, stars his fellow Fly Entertainment artistes US-born actor Jimmy Taenaka and veteran actress Janice Koh and is slated for a 2012 release.

In 2018, Alaric co-produced Zombiepura with film director, Jacen Tan from Hosaywood Studios under the company, JAB films.  It is Alaric's first major role in a horror themed movie and Zombiepura is slated for theatrical release in late Oct 2018 in Singapore.

Other interests 
A student of the late John Spencer, and a former artiste of the Singapore Armed Forces Music and Drama Company (SAF MDC), Tay is an active member of the entertainment community. He is the Vice-President of the NP Film, Sound and Video Alumni Chapter to maintain his association with Breaking into Hollywood.

Tay is also an orator. He has hosted a variety of road shows to Dinner and Dances, to high-profile banquets involving national statesmen, politicians and ambassadors.

Quote 
 "The only obstacles I will truly face in this life are the ones I create for myself."

References

External links 
 

20th-century Singaporean male actors
Singaporean film producers
Singaporean film directors
Living people
1979 births
Singaporean people of Chinese descent
Griffith University alumni
21st-century Singaporean male actors
Singaporean male film actors
Singaporean male television actors